The following outline is provided as an overview of a topical guide to ancient Egypt:

Ancient Egypt – ancient civilization of eastern North Africa, concentrated along the lower reaches of the Nile River in what is now the modern country of Egypt. Egyptian civilization coalesced around 3150 BCE (according to conventional Egyptian chronology) with the political unification of Upper and Lower Egypt under the first pharaoh.

The many achievements of the ancient Egyptians include the quarrying, surveying and construction techniques that facilitated the building of monumental pyramids, temples, and obelisks; a system of mathematics; a practical and effective system of medicine; irrigation systems and agricultural production techniques; some of the first known ships; Egyptian faience and glass technology; new forms of literature; and the earliest known peace treaty. Its monuments have inspired the imaginations of travelers and writers for centuries.

What type of thing is Ancient Egypt? 
Ancient Egypt can be described as:

 an ancient civilization
 a Bronze Age civilization
 part of ancient history

Geography of ancient Egypt

Places

 Abu Gorab
 Abu Mena
 Abu Rawash
 Abu Simbel
 Abusir
 Abydos
 Alexandria
 Al Fayyum/Atef-Pehu
 Amarna/Akhetaten
 Aswan
 Asyut
 Avaris
 Beni Hasan
 Bubastis
 Buhen
 Busiris (Lower Egypt)
 Buto
 Clysma
 Cusae
 Dahshur
 Deir el-Bahri
 Deir el-Medina
 Edfu
 El-Lahun
 Elephantine/Abu/Yebu
 Gebel el-Silsila
 Giza
 Hebenu
 Heliopolis/Annu/Iunu
 Herwer
 Hypselis
 Itjtawy
 Kom el-Hisn
 Luxor
 Memphis/Ineb Hedj
 Mendes
 Naucratis
 Pelusium
 Pi-Ramesses
 Rosetta
 Saqqara
 Sais
 Tanis/Djanet
 Thebes/Niwt/Waset
 Thinis

more...

Government and politics of ancient Egypt

Pharaohs 
 Pharaoh – an article about the history of the title "Pharaoh" with descriptions of the regalia, crowns and titles used.
 List of pharaohs – this article contains a list of the pharaohs of Ancient Egypt, from the Early Dynastic Period before 3000 BCE through to the end of the Ptolemaic Dynasty
 Coronation of the pharaoh
Crowns of Egypt
 Dynasties of Ancient Egypt
 Ancient Egyptian royal titulary

Government officials
 Vizier (Ancient Egypt) – the vizier was the highest official in Ancient Egypt  to serve the king, or pharaoh during the Old, Middle, and New Kingdoms.
 Viceroy of Kush – the Lower Nubian Kush was a province of Egypt from the 16th century BCE to eleventh century BCE.  During this period it was ruled by a viceroy who reported directly to the Egyptian Pharaoh.
 Treasurer (Ancient Egypt) – the treasurer was responsible for products coming to the royal palace. They were the main economical administrator of the royal belongings.

Egyptian law 

Egyptian law

Military of ancient Egypt 

Military of ancient Egypt
 Chariotry in ancient Egypt
 Ancient Egyptian Navy

General history of ancient Egypt 

History of ancient Egypt

History of ancient Egypt, by period 
 Prehistoric Egypt – The Prehistory of Egypt spans the period of earliest human settlement to the beginning of the Early Dynastic Period of Egypt in ca. 3100 BCE.
 Naqada I or Amratian culture - a cultural period in the history of predynastic Upper Egypt, which lasted approximately from 4000 to 3500 BCE.
 Naqada II or Gerzeh culture - The Gerzean is the second of three phases of the Naqada Culture, and so is called Naqada II. It begins circa 3500 BCE lasting through circa 3200 BCE.
 Naqada III or Semainean culture - Naqada III is the last phase of the Naqadan period of ancient Egyptian prehistory, dating approximately from 3200 to 3100 BCE.
 Early Dynastic Period of Egypt – The Archaic or Early Dynastic Period of Egypt immediately follows the unification of Lower and Upper Egypt c. 3100 BCE. It is generally taken to include:
 The First Dynasty of Egypt
 The Second Dynasty of Egypt
 Old Kingdom of Egypt – The name given to the period in the 3rd millennium BCE when Egypt attained its first continuous peak of civilization in complexity and achievement – the first of three so-called "Kingdom" periods, which mark the high points of civilization in the lower Nile Valley. This time period includes:
 The Third Dynasty of Egypt
 The Fourth Dynasty of Egypt
 The Fifth Dynasty of Egypt
 The Sixth Dynasty of Egypt
 First Intermediate Period of Egypt – This period is often described as a “dark period” in Ancient Egyptian history, spanning approximately 140 years after the end of the Old Kingdom from ca. 2181–2055 BCE. It included:
 The possibly spurious Seventh Dynasty of Egypt
 The Eighth Dynasty of Egypt
 The Ninth Dynasty of Egypt
 The Tenth Dynasty of Egypt
 Part of the Eleventh Dynasty of Egypt
 Middle Kingdom of Egypt – The period in the history of ancient Egypt between 2055 BCE and 1650 BCE. This period includes:
 Later part of the Eleventh Dynasty of Egypt
 The Twelfth Dynasty of Egypt
 The Thirteenth Dynasty of Egypt
 The Fourteenth Dynasty of Egypt

Some writers include the Thirteenth and Fourteenth Dynasties in the Second Intermediate Period.

 Second Intermediate Period of Egypt (Hyksos) – a period when Ancient Egypt fell into disarray for a second time, between the end of the Middle Kingdom and the start of the New Kingdom. It is best known as the period when the Hyksos made their appearance in Egypt. This period of disunity comprises
 The Fifteenth Dynasty of Egypt
 The Sixteenth Dynasty of Egypt
 The Abydos Dynasty
 The Seventeenth Dynasty of Egypt

 New Kingdom of Egypt – Also referred to as the Egyptian Empire  is the period in ancient Egyptian history between the 16th century BCE and the 11th century BCE, covering:
 The Eighteenth Dynasty of Egypt
 The Nineteenth Dynasty of Egypt
 The Twentieth Dynasty of Egypt
 Third Intermediate Period – The time in Ancient Egypt from the death of Pharaoh Ramesses XI in 1070 BCE to the foundation of the Twenty-Sixth Dynasty by Psamtik I in 664 BCE. This period includes:
 The Twenty-first Dynasty of Egypt
 The Twenty-second Dynasty of Egypt
 The Twenty-third Dynasty of Egypt
 The Twenty-fourth Dynasty of Egypt
 The Twenty-fifth Dynasty of Egypt
 Late Period of ancient Egypt 
 The Twenty-sixth Dynasty of Egypt, also known as the Saite Period, lasted from 672 BCE to 525 BCE.
 The Twenty-seventh Dynasty of Egypt The First Persian Period (525 BC–404 BC), this period saw Egypt conquered by an expansive Persian Empire under Cambyses.
 The Twenty-eighth Dynasty of Egypt consisted of a single king, Amyrtaeus, prince of Sais, who rebelled against the Persians. This dynasty lasted 6 years, from 404 BC to 398 BC.
 The Twenty-ninth Dynasty of Egypt ruled from Mendes, for the period from  398 BC to 380 BC.
 The Thirtieth Dynasty consisted of a series of three pharaohs ruling from 380 BC until their final defeat in 343 BC lead to the re-occupation by the Persians.
 The Thirty-first Dynasty of Egypt was effectively a satrapy of the Achaemenid Persian Empire between 343 BC to 332 BC.
 The Ptolemaic dynasty ruled the Ptolemaic Kingdom during the Hellenistic period, from 305 to 30 BC. They were the last dynasty of ancient Egypt.
 The Roman/Byzantine reign lasted from 30 BC to 646 AD.
 The Muslim conquest of Egypt took place between 639 and 646 AD.

History of ancient Egypt, by region 
 
 History of Alexandria

History of ancient Egypt, by subject 
 Battle of the Delta
 Battle of Djahy
 Battle of Kadesh
 Battle of Megiddo (15th century BC)
 Battle of the Nile (47 BC)
 Battle of Pelusium
 Battle of Perire
 Egyptian chronology
 Egyptian–Hittite peace treaty
 History of the Karnak Temple complex
 History of timekeeping devices in Egypt
 Military history of Ancient Egypt
 Periodization of Ancient Egypt
 Population history of Egypt
 Sack of Thebes
 Siege of Dapur

Egyptology

Egyptology – study of ancient Egyptian history, language, literature, religion, architecture and art from the 5th millennium BC until the end of its native religious practices in the 4th century AD. A practitioner of the discipline is an "Egyptologist".

Egyptologists

Egyptologist – a practitioner of Egyptology
 Edward R. Ayrton
 Giovanni Battista Belzoni
 Ludwig Borchardt
 Jaroslav Černý
 Alan Gardiner
 Selim Hassan
 Zahi Hawass
 Salima Ikram
 Antonio Loprieno
 Auguste Mariette
 Gaston Maspero
 Édouard Naville
 William Matthew Flinders Petrie
 Kim Ryholt

Museums with ancient Egyptian exhibits 
Museums of Egyptian antiquities

Egypt
 Egyptian Museum
 Giza Solar boat museum
 Grand Egyptian Museum
 Karanis Site Museum
 Luxor Museum
 Luxor Mummification Museum
 National Museum of Egyptian Civilization

France 
 Louvre

Germany
 Bonn Egyptian Museum
 Egyptian Museum of Berlin
 Staatliche Sammlung für Ägyptische Kunst

Italy
 Egyptian Museum (Milan)
 Museo Egizio, Turin
 Palermo Archeological Museum

United Kingdom
 British Museum
 Petrie Museum of Egyptology
 Ashmolean Museum

United States
 Brooklyn Museum
 Metropolitan Museum of Art
 Rosicrucian Egyptian Museum

Culture of ancient Egypt 

Culture of ancient Egypt
 Calendar
 Cats in ancient Egypt
 Clothing in ancient Egypt
Ancient Egyptian flint jewelry
Beauty and cosmetics in ancient Egypt
Coiled sewn sandals
Khat
Nemes
Pectoral
Shendyt
Usekh collar
 Cuisine of ancient Egypt
 Dance in ancient Egypt
 Egyptian astronomy
 Egyptian mathematics
Ancient Egyptian multiplication
Egyptian algebra
Egyptian geometry
Egyptian fraction
Egyptian numerals
 Festivals in ancient Egypt
 Beautiful Festival of the Valley
 Min festival
 Opet Festival
 Sed festival
 Homosexuality in ancient Egypt
 Literature
 Medicine
Ancient Egyptian anatomical studies
Egyptian medical papyri
 Music of Egypt
 Philosophy
 Symbols of ancient Egypt
Ankh
Atef
Deshret
Djed
Hedjet
Pschent
Uraeus
Was scepter
Winged sun
 Technology of ancient Egypt 
 Ancient Egyptian units of measurement
 Stone quarries of ancient Egypt

Architecture of ancient Egypt 

Ancient Egyptian architecture
 Egyptian pyramids
Egyptian pyramid construction techniques
Giza pyramid complex
Pyramidion
Step pyramid
 Egyptian temple
Pylon
 False door
 Gardens of ancient Egypt
 Obelisk
 Urban planning in ancient Egypt

Buildings and structures 
 Block statue
 Egyptian pyramids (List)
 Giza pyramid complex
 Great pyramid of Giza
 Great Sphinx of Giza
 Karnak Temple
 Lighthouse of Alexandria
 Library of Alexandria
 Luxor temple
 Mammisi
 Mastaba
 Serdab

Art of ancient Egypt 
Art of ancient Egypt 
 Amarna art 
 Ancient Egyptian pottery
 Egyptian faience
 Funerary art in Ancient Egypt
 Painting in Ancient Egypt
 Portraiture in Ancient Egypt
 Sculpture in Ancient Egypt

Religion in ancient Egypt 

Ancient Egyptian religion
 Ancient Egyptian afterlife beliefs
 Ancient Egyptian deities
 Egyptian pantheon
Ennead
 Atum
 Shu
 Tefnut
 Geb
 Nut
 Osiris 
 Isis 
 Horus
 Set
 Nephthys
 Ogdoad of Hermopolis
 Amun and Amunet
 Heh and Hauhet
 Kek and Kauket
 Nu and Naunet
 Theban Triad
 Amun
 Mut
 Khonsu
 Major deities
AmunAnhurAnubisApepApisAtenBastetBennuHathorKhepriKhnumKhonsuMontuMutNeithPtahRaSekhmetSetShuSobekThoth
 Other deities
AmmitBesMaahesMinPakhetSekerSeshatTawaretWadjetWepwawet
 Ancient Egyptian funerary practices
 Canopic jars
 Mummy
List of Egyptian mummies (royalty)
Opening of the mouth ceremony
 Reserve head
 Wooden tomb model
Ancient Egyptian funerary texts
 Amduat
 Book of Caverns
 Book of Gates
 Book of Nut
 Book of the Dead
Book of the Dead spells
 Book of the Earth
 Book of the Heavenly Cow
 Book of the Netherworld
 Book of Traversing Eternity
 Books of Breathing
 Litany of Re
 Litany of the Eye of Horus
 Spell of the Twelve Caves
 Coffin Texts
 Pyramid Texts 
 Ancient Egyptian offering formula
 Ancient Egyptian retainer sacrifices
 Mortuary temple
 Decline of ancient Egyptian religion
 Religious concepts
 Aaru
 Akh
 Ba
 Duat
 Egyptian soul
 Isfet
 Ka
 Kek
 Maat
 Shai
 Egyptian mythology
 Major myths
 Ancient Egyptian creation myths
 Osiris myth
 Numbers in Egyptian mythology

Ancient Egyptian language 

Ancient Egyptian language
 Stages of ancient Egyptian language
Archaic Egyptian: before 2600 BC, the language of the Early Dynastic Period. Egyptian writing in the form of labels and signs has been dated to 3200 BC.
Old Egyptian: 2686 BC – 2181 BC, the language of the Old Kingdom
Middle Egyptian: 2055 BC – 1650 BC, characterized the  Middle Kingdom (2055 BC – 1650 BC), but endured through the early 18th Dynasty until the Amarna Period (1353 BC), and continued on as a literary language into the 4th century AD.
Late Egyptian: 1069 BC – 700 BC, characterized the Third Intermediate Period (1069 BC – 700 BC), but started earlier with the Amarna Period (1353 BC).
Demotic: 7th century BC – 5th century AD, from the Late Period through Roman times
Coptic: 1st century AD – 17th century AD, from early Roman times to early modern times
 Writing systems
 Hieroglyphs
Cursive hieroglyphs
 Hieratic
 Demotic
 Decipherment of ancient Egyptian scripts
 Transliteration of Ancient Egyptian

Egyptian economy 
 Ancient Egyptian agriculture
Cattle count
 Ancient Egyptian trade
Foreign contacts of ancient Egypt
 Mining industry of Egypt
 Palace economy
 Stone quarries of ancient Egypt

Publications about ancient Egypt 
 Ancient Egypt (magazine)
 Ancient Egyptian Hieroglyphs: A Practical Guide
 Hieroglyphics: The Writings of Ancient Egypt
 The Hieroglyphs of Ancient Egypt
 Oxford Encyclopedia of Ancient Egypt
 Reading Egyptian Art: A Hieroglyphic Guide to Ancient Egyptian Painting and Sculpture

See also 

 Index of ancient Egypt–related articles
 Glossary of ancient Egypt artifacts
 Outline of classical studies

 Ancient Egypt lists
 List of ancient Egyptians
 List of ancient Egyptian palettes
 List of ancient Egyptian papyri
 List of ancient Egyptian scribes
 List of Egyptian hieroglyphs
 List of Egyptian pyramids
 List of pharaohs
 List of portraiture offerings with Ancient Egyptian hieroglyphs
 List of Theban tombs
 Lists of Egyptian hieroglyphs

References

External links 

 Ancient Egypt video by the National Geographic

Outlines of geography and places
Ancient Egypt